Epilobium alsinifolium is a species of willowherb known by the common name chickweed willowherb. This small flowering plant can be found in European arctic regions and further south in mountainous regions with an Arctic climate, as well as in Greenland. It is a perennial found in low clumps approximately 10 to 25 centimeters in height. It has wide, rounded basal leaves and narrower leaves further up the stem. It bears purple or pinkish trumpet-shaped flowers, 7 to 12 millimeters in diameter, and the fruit is a capsule two or three centimeters long.

References

External links

alsinifolium
Flora of the United Kingdom
Flora of Ireland
Flora of Greenland
Flora of Spain
Flora of Greece